Dzidra Rinkule-Zemzare (8 July 1920 – 4 November 2007), was a Latvian poet and children's book author.

References 

1920 births
Latvian writers
Latvian women writers
2007 deaths